Forever Reign may refer to:

 Forever Reign (Hillsong Church album), 2012
 "Forever Reign" (song), a 2010 contemporary Christian worship song
 Forever Reign (One Sonic Society album), 2012